Revenue stamps of Mali have been issued since the country's independence in 1960, and prior to that the colony of French Sudan also had its own revenue stamps. The first issue after independence consisted of revenue stamps of France of the "Daussy" key type overprinted REPUBLIQUE DU MALI.

A second set of revenue stamps having a similar design to the first issue but incorporating the coat of arms of Mali was issued in around 1973. Three other sets of stamps have been issued since then, all bearing the coat of arms and local sculptures. All known Mali revenue stamps are inscribed Timbre Fiscal, for general-duty fiscal purposes.

Use of revenue stamps has mostly been limited to the southern part of Mali, in part due to the instability in northern Mali. Revenues are most commonly seen on passports or other travel and identity documents. Mali revenue stamps are also used in the country's diplomatic missions abroad.

See also
Postage stamps and postal history of Mali

References

Philately of Mali
Economy of Mali
Mali